Govindrajan is an Indian Politician from Tamil Nadu. He represents Gummidipoondi of Tamil Nadu Legislative Assembly. He is member of Dravida Munnetra Kazhagam.

Electoral performance

References 

Tamil Nadu MLAs 2021–2026
Year of birth missing (living people)
Living people